Minister for Disability Services is a position in the government of Western Australia, currently held by Stephen Dawson of the Labor Party. The position was first created in 1991, for the government of Carmen Lawrence, and has existed in every government since then. The minister is responsible for the state government's Disability Services Commission.

Titles
 20 August 1991 – present: Minister for Disability Services

List of ministers

See also
 Minister for Community Services (Western Australia)
 Minister for Health (Western Australia)
 Minister for Mental Health (Western Australia)

References
 David Black (2014), The Western Australian Parliamentary Handbook (Twenty-Third Edition). Perth [W.A.]: Parliament of Western Australia.

Disability
Minister for Disability
Disability in Australia